Jeremy W. Peters is an American journalist, author and reporter for The New York Times,. He has covered three presidential elections for the newspaper, most recently the 2020 presidential election. He is an MSNBC contributor, and has also appeared on Washington Week on PBS. In February 2022, he published his first book, Insurgency: How Republicans Lost Their Party and Got Everything They Ever Wanted, which was selected as a New York Times Editor's Choice and was reviewed in The Washington Post  and The Guardian.

Early life and education 
Jeremy W. Peters was born in Royal Oak, Michigan.

Peters earned his bachelor's degree in history and political science from the University of Michigan.

Career 

When Peters was in his senior year at the University of Michigan he was a reporter and editor for The Michigan Daily and began contributing to The New York Times as a freelancer. He then worked for two years in the Virgin Islands for The Virgin Islands Daily News before returning to the Times as a reporter for the business and national desks based in Detroit. In 2009, while assigned to the Albany bureau, he was part of the team that won the Pulitzer Prize for breaking news, for its coverage of the sex scandal that resulted in the resignation of Gov. Eliot Spitzer.

His coverage of the Republican Party and the conservative movement for The Times became the basis for his book, Insurgency, which the Crown Publishing Group acquired in 2017. Peters was one of several Times journalists featured in the 2018 Showtime documentary, The Fourth Estate.

References

Further reading
  — Redef.com compilation of published work by Peters.
  — Personal memo to NYT Staff at time of Peters' hiring.
  — Programming webpage for this AV work.

Year of birth missing (living people)
Living people
The New York Times writers
American male journalists
University of Michigan College of Literature, Science, and the Arts alumni
The Michigan Daily alumni